Manik Jodi (1963) is an Oriya film directed by Prabhat Mukherjee

Cast
Urabashi Joshi
Akshaya Mohanty Kashyap
Sukhalata Mohanty
Mayadhara Raut
Sahu Samuel

Lyrics
 Pramod Panigrahi

References

External links
 

1963 drama films
1963 films
1960s Odia-language films